Cupressus is one of several genera of evergreen conifers within the family Cupressaceae that have the common name cypress; for the others, see cypress. It is considered a polyphyletic group. Based on genetic and morphological analysis, the genus Cupressus is found in the subfamily Cupressoideae.  The common name "cypress" comes via the Old French cipres from the Latin cyparissus,  which is the latinisation of the Greek κυπάρισσος (kypárissos).

Taxonomy 
There has long been significant uncertainty about the New World members of Cupressus, with several studies recovering them as forming a distinct clade from the Old World members. A 2021 molecular study found Cupressus to be the sister genus to Juniperus, whereas the western members (classified in Callitropsis and Hesperocyparis) were found to be sister to Xanthocyparis.

Description
They are evergreen trees or large shrubs, growing to 5–40 m tall. The leaves are scale-like, 2–6 mm long, arranged in opposite decussate pairs, and persist for three to five years. On young plants up to two years old, the leaves are needle-like and 5–15 mm long. The cones are 8–40 mm long, globose or ovoid with four to 14 scales arranged in opposite decussate pairs; they are mature in 18–24 months from pollination. The seeds are small, 4–7 mm long, with two narrow wings, one along each side of the seed.

Many of the species are adapted to forest fires, holding their seeds for many years in closed cones until the parent trees are killed by a fire; the seeds are then released to colonise the bare, burnt ground. In other species, the cones open at maturity to release the seeds.

Distribution
As currently treated, these cypresses are native to scattered localities in mainly warm temperate regions in the Northern Hemisphere, including western North America, Central America, northwest Africa, the Middle East, the Himalayas, southern China and northern Vietnam. As with other conifers, extensive cultivation has led to a wide variety of forms, sizes and colours, that are grown in parks and gardens throughout the world.

Cultivation
Many species of cypress are grown as decorative trees in parks and, in Asia, around temples; in some areas, the native distribution is hard to discern due to extensive cultivation. A few species are grown for their timber, which can be very durable. The fast-growing hybrid Leyland cypress (Cupressus × leylandii), much used in gardens, draws one of its parents from this genus (Cupressus macrocarpa, Monterey cypress); the other parent, Callitropsis nootkatensis (Nootka cypress), is also sometimes classified in this genus, or else in the separate genus Xanthocyparis, but in the past more usually in Chamaecyparis.

Cultural references 
It was believed in the Hellenic culture that the cypress tree was sacred to the gods and it is now used as an emblem of grief. 
The name of the genus comes from Cyparissus,  a young man loved by Apollo, very attached to a deer which he ended up killing by mistake during a hunting trip. To ease the pain Apollo transformed the boy into a plant.
The association with mourning continued in Roman times, up to the present day, also for a practical reason: the roots of the cypress are straight into the ground, and expand slightly laterally, not damaging the burials.

Species
The number of species recognised within this genus varies sharply, from 16 to 25 or more according to the authority followed, because most populations are small and isolated, and whether they should be accorded specific, subspecific or varietal rank is difficult to ascertain. Current tendencies are to reduce the number of recognised species; when a narrow species concept is adopted, the varieties indented in the list below may also be accepted as distinct species. See also the New World species (below) for a likely split in the genus in the future.

Old World species
The Old World cypresses tend to have cones with more scales (8–14 scales, rarely 6 in C. funebris), each scale with a short broad ridge, not a spike. C. sempervirens is the type species of the genus, defining the name Cupressus. They are more closely related to Juniperus than to the New World species, with the exception of the Vietnamese golden cypress, which is more closely related to New World species.

New World species 
The New World cypresses tend to have cones with fewer scales (4-8 scales, rarely more in C. macrocarpa), each scale with an often prominent narrow spike. Recent genetic evidence shows they are less closely related to the Old World cypresses than previously thought, being more closely related to Xanthocyparis than to the rest of Cupressus. These species have recently been transferred to Hesperocyparis and Callitropsis. New World species are found in marginal habitats with xeric soils, and therefore exhibit a fragmented allopatric pattern of distribution. This type of distribution results in disproportionate local abundance with most species restricted to small neighboring populations.

{| class="wikitable"
|-
! Image
! Cone
! Name
! Common Name
! Distribution
|-
|
|
|Cupressus abramsiana (Cupressus goveniana var. abramsiana; Callitropsis abramsiana;)
|Santa Cruz cypress
| Santa Cruz Mountains of Santa Cruz and San Mateo Counties in west-central California
|-
|
|
|Cupressus arizonica (Callitropsis arizonica)
|Arizona cypress
| southwestern United States (Arizona, Utah, southwestern New Mexico, and southern California, with a few populations in southern Nevada and in the Chisos Mountains of western Texas), and in Mexico (Coahuila, Nuevo León, Chihuahua, Sonora, Durango, Tamaulipas, Zacatecas and northern Baja California).
|-
|
|
|Cupressus bakeri (Callitropsis bakeri)
|Modoc cypress
| northern California and extreme southwestern Oregon
|-
|
|
|Cupressus forbesii (Callitropsis forbesii)
|Tecate cypress
| Santa Ana Mountains of Orange County and in San Diego County within Southern California, and in northern Baja California state of Mexico.
|-
|
|
|Cupressus glabra (Callitropsis glabra)
|smooth Arizona cypress
|  Sedona, Arizona
|-
|
|
|Cupressus goveniana (Callitropsis goveniana)
|Gowen cypress, Californian cypress
|  Monterey County, California
|-
|
|
|Cupressus guadalupensis (Callitropsis guadalupensis )
|Guadalupe cypress
|  Mexico, found only on Guadalupe Island 
|-
|
|
|Cupressus lusitanica (Callitropsis lusitanica )
|Mexican cypress
|   Mexico and Central America (Guatemala, El Salvador and Honduras)
|-
|
|
|Cupressus macnabiana (Callitropsis macnabiana ) 
|Macnab cypress
| northern California
|-
|
|
|Cupressus macrocarpa (Callitropsis macrocarpa )
|Monterey cypress
| Cypress Point in Pebble Beach and at Point Lobos near Carmel, California
|-
|
|
|Cupressus nevadensis (Callitropsis nevadensis ) 
|Piute cypress
|  Southern Sierra Nevada, within Kern County, California and Tulare County.
|-
|
|
|Cupressus nootkatensis (syn: Xanthocyparis nootkatensis)
|Nootka cypress
| Vancouver Island, British Columbia, Canada
|-
|
|
|Cupressus pigmaea (Cupressus goveniana var. pigmaea; Callitropsis pigmaea )
|Mendocino cypress
|  Mendocino and Sonoma Counties in northwestern California
|-
|
|
|Cupressus revealiana 
|El Rincon cypress
| Baja California in northwestern Mexico
|-
|
|
|Cupressus sargentii (Callitropsis sargentii)
|Sargent cypress
| Mendocino County southwards to Santa Barbara County California
|-
|
|
|Cupressus stephensonii (Callitropsis stephensonii )
|Cuyamaca cypress
|  San Diego County California
|-
|}

Allergenic potential
All plants in the genus Cupressus, including New World Cupressus (now Callitropsis), are extremely allergenic, and have an OPALS allergy scale rating of 10. In warm, Mediterranean climates, these plants release large quantities of pollen for approximately seven months each year.

References

Farjon, A. (2005). Monograph of Cupressaceae and Sciadopitys. Royal Botanic Gardens, Kew. .
Gadek, P. A., Alpers, D. L., Heslewood, M. M., & Quinn, C. J. (2000). Relationships within Cupressaceae sensu lato: a combined morphological and molecular approach. American Journal of Botany'' 87: 1044–1057. Available online .

 
Conifer genera